The 40th Federal Congress of the Spanish Socialist Workers' Party was held in Valencia from 15 October to 17 October 2021, to renovate the governing bodies of the Spanish Socialist Workers' Party (PSOE) and establish the party's main lines of action and strategy for the next leadership term. A primary election to elect the new party secretary-general was initially scheduled for 26 September, but as a result of no opposing candidates running for election, Pedro Sánchez was proclaimed unopposed as party leader on 13 September.

Timetable 
The key dates are listed below (all times are CET):

3 July: Official announcement of the congress.
1 September: Submission of pre-candidacies and start of endorsement collection period.
10 September: End of endorsement collection period.
12 September: Proclamation of candidates to the party general secretariat.
13 September: Official start of internal information campaign.
25 September: Last day of internal information campaign.
26 September: Primary election (first round of voting), election of congress delegates and deadline for amendment submission. 
28 September: Definitive proclamation of the party secretary-general (if elected in primary election).
3 October: Primary election (second round of voting). 
7 October: Definitive proclamation of the party secretary-general (if not previously proclaimed).
15–17 October: Federal congress.

Candidates

Results

References

2021 conferences
Political party leadership elections in Spain
PSOE Congresses
PSOE leadership election